Rodenstock may refer to:

Companies
 Rodenstock GmbH, a German manufacturer of ophthalmic lenses and frames. 
 Rodenstock Photo Optics, a photographic brand by Excelitas Technolgies (formerly owned by LINOS Photonics, 2000–06, and Qioptiq Group, 2006–13)

Individuals
 Hardy Rodenstock (1941–2018), pseudonym for Meinhard Görke, a German wine collector
 Josef Rodenstock (1846–1932), German entrepreneur
 Alexander Rodenstock (1883–1953), German entrepreneur and economic functionary
 Rolf Rodenstock (1917–1997), German economist and economic functionary
 Randolf Rodenstock (* 1948), German entrepreneur and economic functionary